Zero She Flies is the third studio album by folk artist Al Stewart, released in 1970. It is the first of his albums to include a song with historical references, namely "Manuscript", which refers to the events which led to the outbreak of World War I, including the assassination of Archduke Franz Ferdinand of Austria.

The expression "zero she flies" comes from early aviation and refers to the flight of a plane (typically a biplane) flying blind but exactly on course through darkness or dense fog.

Album information 
The album is commercially available as part of a CD boxset To Whom It May Concern, which contains his first three albums as well as a single and its B side and a couple of tracks added to the rerelease of Bed-Sitter Images in 1970. The 2007 re-release includes bonus tracks.

Track listing 
All tracks composed by Al Stewart; except where indicated.

Original LP release
"My Enemies Have Sweet Voices" (Stewart, Peter Morgan)
"A Small Fruit Song"
"Gethsemane, Again"
"Burbling"
"Electric Los Angeles Sunset"
"Manuscript"
"Black Hill"
"Anna"
"Room of Roots"
"Zero She Flies"

2007 Collectors' Choice Music edition
"My Enemies Have Sweet Voices" (Stewart, Peter Morgan)  – 5:14 
"A Small Fruit Song" – 2:02 
"Gethsemane, Again" – 5:28 
"Burbling" – 3:19 
"Electric Los Angeles Sunset" – 3:47 
"Manuscript" – 4:45 
"Black Hill" – 1:22 
"Anna" – 1:47 
"Room of Roots" – 3:52 
"Zero She Flies" – 5:35 
"Stormy Night" – 3:29 
"News from Spain" – 6:05 
"Lyke-Wake Dirge" (Traditional) – 4:22 vocals by Mimi Fariña

Personnel
Al Stewart - guitar, vocals
Performers: Duffy Power, Georg Hultgreen, Gerry Conway, Larry Steele, Louis Cennamo, Michael Woods, Peter Gavin, Tim Hinkley, Trevor Lucas
Technical
Jerry Boys - engineer
Sophie Litchfield - photography

Sources

External links 
Al Stewart discography

Al Stewart albums
1970 albums
CBS Records albums
RCA Records albums
Collectors' Choice Music albums